Acleris fimbriana, the yellow tortrix moth, is a species of moth of the family Tortricidae. It is found in France, Germany, Denmark, Italy, Slovakia, Hungary, Romania, Poland, Norway, Sweden, Finland, the Baltic region, Ukraine and Russia. It is also found in China and South Korea.

The wingspan is 18–20 mm. Adults are on wing from August to May.

The larvae feed on Prunus spinosa, Vaccinium uliginosum, Betula nana, Malus domestica and Spiraea species. Larvae can be found from May to June and in August.

References

Moths described in 1791
fimbriana
Moths of Europe
Moths of Asia